Qataat (also Romanized as Qaţa‘āt; also known as Qaţa‘āt Qeshlāq) is a village in Japelaq-e Gharbi Rural District, Japelaq District, Azna County, Lorestan Province, Iran. At the 2006 census, its population was 50, in 9 families.

References 

Towns and villages in Azna County